Frank Conroy may refer to:
 Frank Conroy (author) (1936–2005), American author
 Frank Conroy (actor) (1890–1964), British film and stage actor
 Frank Conroy (American football) (c. 1939–2016),  American football coach